Marcus Royster Plantation is a historic tobacco plantation house and national historic district located near Wilbourns, Granville County, North Carolina.  The house was built about 1850, and is a two-story, three bay, "T"-plan, heavy timber frame Greek Revival style dwelling.  It has a low hipped roof and classical portico.  Also on the property are the contributing air-curing barn, smokehouse, two log tobacco barns, log corn crib, two frame barns, a small log barn, frame smokehouse, and a frame former tenant house.

It was listed on the National Register of Historic Places in 1988.

References

Tobacco plantations in the United States
Plantation houses in North Carolina
Farms on the National Register of Historic Places in North Carolina
Greek Revival houses in North Carolina
Houses completed in 1850
Houses in Granville County, North Carolina
National Register of Historic Places in Granville County, North Carolina
Historic districts on the National Register of Historic Places in North Carolina